Coleophora kizildashi is a moth of the family Coleophoridae which is endemic to Armenia.

References

External links

kizildashi
Endemic fauna of Armenia
Moths of Asia
Moths described in 2002